von Sydow, often used in German and Swedish with the word "von" meaning "of", is a locational surname, which originally meant simply a person from one of several places called Sydow in northern Germany. The name may refer to:

Björn von Sydow (born 1945), Swedish politician
Ebba von Sydow (born 1981), Swedish journalist
Emil von Sydow (1812–1873), German geographer
Fredrik von Sydow (1908–1932), Swedish murderer
Hans Joachim Friedrich von Sydow (1762–1823), Prussian general
Henrik von Sydow (born 1976), Swedish politician
Hjalmar von Sydow (1862–1932), Swedish politician
Max von Sydow (1929–2020), Swedish actor
Oscar von Sydow (1873–1936), Swedish politician
Rolf von Sydow (1924–2019), German film director

See also
Sydow

References

German-language surnames